Buckley Lake may refer to:

Buckley Lake (British Columbia), in Mount Edziza Provincial Park
Buckley Lake (Ontario), in Peterborough County